Nicolae Vereș (born on 1 July 1963 is a former Romanian rugby union player who played as lock.

Career
Vereș started his sporting career, when he was discovered by the Dinamo coach Gheorghe Drăgan. His first international cap for Romania was against Tunisia, in Constanța, on 5 October 1986. He was also part of the Romanian squad for the 1987 Rugby World Cup, where he played only the match against France at the Athletic Park, Wellington. His last cap for Romania was against USSR in Almaty, on 23 October 1988.

References

External links
Nicolae Veres international stats

1963 births
Living people
Romanian rugby union players
Romania international rugby union players
CS Dinamo București (rugby union) players
Rugby union locks
Romanian people of Hungarian descent